Submission (aka Scandal) is an Italian film filmed in technicolor and directed by Salvatore Samperi based on his own script written in collaboration with Ottavio Jemma, according to Samperi. It belongs to the drama and erotic genres and had as principal actors Franco Nero, Lisa Gastoni, Raymond Pellegrin and Andréa Ferréol.

Plot

On a 1940 France, just before the great invasion, Eliane is a pharmacist who is married to her dull husband and has a teenage daughter. Eliane is an attractive woman who has let her passion fall dormant.

One evening, the pharmacy clerk makes a pass at her when he thinks she is another girl. Soon she lets the passion overtake her and she begins an affair with her employee. Armand, the pharmacy clerk, starts making ever-growing demands to Eliane, forcing her to have sex under the pharmacy counter and undress in front of a female employee of the pharmacy (who is also having an affair with Armand), among others demands, effectively turning her into his sex slave.

When Eliane finally let herself admit her submission to Armand, he demands her teenage daughter to prove she'd do anything for him.

Cast 
Franco Nero as Armand
Lisa Gastoni as Eliane Michoud
Raymond Pellegrin as Prof. Henri Michoud 
Andréa Ferréol as Juliette
Claudia Marsani as Justine Michoud
Carla Calò as Carmen

See also 
 
 List of Italian films of 1976

References

External links

Italian crime drama films
Italian erotic drama films
1970s Italian-language films
1976 crime drama films
1976 films
BDSM in films
Films directed by Salvatore Samperi
Films scored by Riz Ortolani
1970s erotic drama films
1970s Italian films